John Wesley Veney (August 14, 1889 – December 28, 1955) was an American Negro league catcher in the 1910s.

A native of Grottoes, Virginia, Veney played for the Homestead Grays in 1918. He died in Homestead, Pennsylvania in 1955 at age 66.

References

External links
 and Seamheads

1889 births
1955 deaths
Homestead Grays players
Baseball catchers
Baseball players from Virginia
People from Grottoes, Virginia
20th-century African-American people